Allan Ramsay may refer to:
Allan Ramsay (poet) or Allan Ramsay the Elder (1686–1758), Scottish poet
Allan Ramsay (artist) or Allan Ramsay the Younger (1713–1784), Scottish portrait painter
Allan Ramsay (diplomat) (1937–2022), British diplomat
Allan M. Ramsay (born 1953), professor of computer science
Allan Ramsay (portrait painter, born 1959), Scottish painter

See also 
Alan Ramsay (1895–1973), Australian army general
Alan Ramsey (1938–2020), Australian newspaper reporter and commentator
Willis Alan Ramsey (born 1951), American singer/songwriter